The Cassia County Courthouse, located at Fifteenth Street and Overland Avenue in Burley, is the county courthouse serving Cassia County, Idaho.

History 
Built in 1939, the courthouse was the third space used by county government and the county's first large, independent courthouse. The Works Progress Administration funded the building, and Twin Falls architect Burton E. Morse provided its Art Deco design. 

The courthouse was added to the National Register of Historic Places on September 27, 1987.

Design 
The brick building's design consists of a three-story tower above the central entrance and two-story wings on either side. Brick pilasters topped with terra cotta divide the building into entrance and window bays. Terra cotta panels surrounded by ornamental brickwork decorate the entrance bay, and a flat terra cotta course runs along the roof line.

See also
Burley, Idaho
Cassia County, Idaho

References

Courthouses on the National Register of Historic Places in Idaho
County courthouses in Idaho
Buildings and structures in Cassia County, Idaho
Art Deco architecture in Idaho
National Register of Historic Places in Cassia County, Idaho